Pearson McAdam Muir (1846–1924)  was the minister of Glasgow Cathedral and Moderator of the General Assembly of the Church of Scotland in 1910. He served as Grand Chaplain of the Grand Lodge of Freemasons of Scotland. He was Chaplain in Ordinary in Scotland to King Edward VI.

Life

He was born in the manse in  Kirkmabreck in Kirkcudbrightshire on 26 January 1846, the son of Rev John Muir (1805–1858) and his wife, Gloriana Pearson McAdam (1806–1888).  He was educated at Glasgow High School. He then studied divinity at Glasgow University. He was licensed to preach in December 1868 and began his ministry assisting consecutively in Monkton, Ayrshire, before moving to Prestwick and then Stevenston.

His first sole charge was to Catrine in 1870. He was minister at Polmont near Falkirk 1872 to 1880, replacing Rev John Wightman Ker, then came to Morningside, Edinburgh to his first major city church. In 1893 Glsgow University awarded him an honorary doctorate (DD). In 1896 he was requested to replace the Rev George Stewart Burns at Glasgow Cathedral.

In 1909 he was appointed army chaplain to the Cameronians (Scottish Rifles). Also in 1909 he gave The Baird Lecture his topic being "Modern Substitutes for Christianity".

He retired to Edinburgh and died in 1924. He is buried in Morningside Cemetery, Edinburgh. The grave lies towards the south-east corner in one of the north-south rows.

Family

He married Sophia Ann Chrystal (died 1907) in 1871. She was the daughter of Rev James Chrystal DD LLD, himself moderator in 1879.
They had five children: Sophia Playfair Muir, Rev James Chrystal Muir, John Joseph Johnston Muir, Gloriana Margaret Muir, and Jane Playfair Chrystal Menzies.

Publications

Samuel Rutherford (1881)
History of the Church of Scotland (1890)
Religious Writers of England (1898)
Monuments and Inscriptions in Glasgow Cathedral (1898)
Modern Substitutes for Christianity

References

1846 births
1924 deaths
Scottish non-fiction writers
Scottish Freemasons
Alumni of the University of Glasgow
Moderators of the General Assembly of the Church of Scotland
19th-century Ministers of the Church of Scotland
20th-century Ministers of the Church of Scotland